Yang Zhenwu (born May 1955) is a Chinese politician who served as president of the People's Daily from 2014 to 2018. He joined the Chinese Communist Party (CCP) in April 1975, and entered the workforce in September 1978. He is a member of the 19th Central Committee of the Chinese Communist Party. He was a representative of the 17th and 18th National Congress of the Chinese Communist Party.

Biography
Yang was born in Xinle County, Hebei, in May 1955. In 1975, he entered Nankai University, majoring in Chinese language and literature.

After graduating in 1978, he was dispatched to the People's Daily, where he was promoted to editor-in-chief in 2013 and to president in 2014. He also served as head of the Propaganda Department of the CCP Shanghai Municipal Committee and member of the Standing Committee of the CCP Shanghai Municipal Committee between 2009 and 2013. In 2018, he took office as secretary-general of the Standing Committee of the 13th National People's Congress.

References

1955 births
Living people
People from Shijiazhuang
Nankai University alumni
Central Party School of the Chinese Communist Party alumni
People's Republic of China politicians from Hebei
Chinese Communist Party politicians from Hebei
Members of the 19th Central Committee of the Chinese Communist Party